Omar Ahmed (born 1979) is an amateur boxer from Kenya.

Omar Ahmed or Omar Ahmad may also refer to:

 Omar Ahmed (born 1978), better known as Robert Kipkoech Cheruiyot, Kenyan long-distance runner
 Omar Ahmad (born 1959), founder of the Council on American-Islamic Relations
 Omar Ahmad (politician) (1964–2011), American Internet entrepreneur and politician
 Omar Emboirik Ahmed (born 1956), Sahrawi ambassador to Venezuela

See also
 
 Ahmed Omar, Lebanese-born Qatari footballer
 Ahmed Omar (cyclist) (born 1933), Moroccan cyclist